General elections were held in the Dominican Republic on 16 May 1930. They were held three months after President Horacio Vásquez was deposed in a coup. When it became apparent that Dominican Army commander Rafael Trujillo would be the only candidate that the army would allow to campaign unhindered, the other candidates all withdrew, leaving Trujillo to take the presidency unopposed. The Confederation of Parties (also called the Patriotic Coalition of Citizens) won every seat in the Congressional elections.

Results

References

Dominican Republic
1930 in the Dominican Republic
Elections in the Dominican Republic
Single-candidate elections
Presidential elections in the Dominican Republic
Election and referendum articles with incomplete results
May 1930 events